European route E20 is a part of the United Nations International E-road network. It runs roughly west–east through Ireland, the United Kingdom, Denmark, Sweden, Estonia, and Russia. 

Its length is  but it is not continuous; at three points, a sea crossing is required. Roll-on/roll-off ferries make the crossings from Dublin to Liverpool and from Stockholm to Tallinn. No publicly accessible ferries traverse the North Sea from Kingston-upon-Hull to Esbjerg (as of 2019), but a ferry for commercial drivers leaves Immingham for Esbjerg on most days.

Route

Ireland 
The initial section of the E20 from Shannon Airport to Dublin via Limerick is approximately 228 km long and is only partially signed, along the M7/N7. The section from Shannon Airport to east of Limerick is mainly dual carriageway, with a short section of motorway as part of the Limerick Southern Ring Road. The Shannon Tunnel, opened on 16 July 2010, completed the bypass of Limerick. The section from Limerick to Naas is motorway (M7), and the final section from Naas to Dublin is dual carriageway (N7). A ferry must be used from Dublin to Liverpool.

United Kingdom 
E20 follows the A5080 from Liverpool to Huyton, the M62 and M60 from Huyton to South Cave, and the A63 from South Cave to Kingston upon Hull.

There are no ferries between Kingston upon Hull and Esbjerg. There are no longer any passenger routes operating between the UK and Scandinavia.

The closest alternative is to take the Eurotunnel Shuttle from Cheriton (Folkestone) to Calais, or take a ferry from Harwich to Hook of Holland. Both of these routes would require a detour of around 900 miles (940 miles to Esbjerg, as this route would require you to drive along the E20 to reach Esbjerg).

Denmark 
In Denmark, E20 is a motorway from Esbjerg to the Øresund Bridge.

It passes first along Jutland from Esbjerg to Kolding, then crosses the Little Belt Bridge onto Funen. E20 crosses the entirety of Funen, passing approximately 2 km south of Odense. Then, at Nyborg, E20 crosses the Great Belt Fixed Link onto Zealand. E20 follows the Vestmotorvejen until Køge, where it goes north to Copenhagen. In Copenhagen, E20 passes south of the city, crossing onto Kastrup where it meets the Copenhagen Airport. Between Køge and Copenhagen, the road has three E-road numbers (also E47 and E55).

The Great Belt Bridge and Øresund Bridge are both tolled. The Øresund crossing begins as a tunnel at Kastrup, which then transfers onto the bridge at the man-made island Peberholm. The road crosses the border between Denmark and Sweden on the Øresund Bridge.

Sweden 
Furthermore, it is a motorway most of the route from Vretstorp (20 km (12 mi) west of Örebro) to Stockholm.

The part through Stockholm has very heavy traffic, including the most heavily trafficked road in Scandinavia, Essingeleden (160 000 vehicles/day). There is often congestion on this stretch. A new tunnel for route E20, "Norra länken", was built north of the city center and opened 30 November 2014. The planned Förbifart Stockholm bypass will divert traffic from Essingeleden.

Between Stockholm and Tallinn a car ferry departs daily, taking 15 hours. The port in Stockholm is located at Lilla Värtan, about 4 km northeast of the central core of the city.

A 21 km stretch of the E20 between Hallsberg and Örebro is planned to become by 2025 the first permanent electric road in Sweden.

Estonia 
In Estonia, E20 follows the route of national main road nr. 1 (Tallinn–Narva). In Tallinn to relieve traffic a bridge has been built on the intersection of the E263 and the E20. The E20 across Estonia is partially an unsigned expressway (speed limit 110 km/h in summer), for 80.7 km east of Tallinn to Aaspere along with a section near Haljala (km 87 - 90.5) and a section between Kohtla-Järve and Jõhvi (km 155.9–163.2). The remainder being single carriageway. The distance from Tallinn to the Russian border at the Narva River is 218 km.

Russia 
In Russia, the route takes the Narva Highway (also listed in the Russian road numbering system as the A180 route, formerly known as the M11 route) running from Ivangorod to Saint Petersburg as a dual-lane highway. The distance from Ivangorod to Saint Petersburg is 142 km.

The border control facilities at the Estonia-Russia crossing are equipped and being operated for a limited amount of traffic on both sides of the border. The border crossing requires a reservation - despite this, waiting lines still can extend for many hours and even days.

Itinerary 

: Shannon - Limerick
: Limerick - Borris-in-Ossory - Portlaoise - Naas
: Naas - Dublin
: Dublin
Gap (Irish Sea)
:  Dublin -  Liverpool

: Bootle
: Liverpool Outer Ring Road (Whole length)
: Manchester Outer Ring Road (Clockwise)
:  - Hull
: Hull
Gap (North Sea)
 Hull -  Esbjerg

: Esbjerg - Kolding - Køge (Start of Concurrency with  ) - København (End of Concurrency with  )

Gap (Baltic Sea)
:  Stockholm -  Tallinn

Jõe, Narva maantee, Tartu maantee: Tallinn
: Tallinn - Jõhvi - Narva

: Ivangorod - Saint Petersburg (Towards   )

References

External links 
 UN Economic Commission for Europe: Overall Map of E-road Network (2007)

20
20
E020
2-0020
E020
E020
E20
E020
E020
E020
E020
E020
E020
E020
E020
E020
E020
E020
2-0020
2-0020